The local churches are a Christian group which was started in China in the 1920s and have spread globally. The basic organizing principle of the local churches is that there should be only one Christian church in each city, a principle that was first articulated by Watchman Nee in a 1926 exposition of the seven churches in Asia in Revelation 1:11. The local churches do not take a name, but some outsiders referred to the group as the "Little Flock" as they sang from a hymnal entitled Hymns for the Little Flock.

From early on, members of this group emphasized a personal experience of Christ and the establishment of a pattern of church practice according to the New Testament. Though assemblies identifying as "local churches" can be found worldwide, there are no definitive statistics available on membership, partly because the largest number of members are in China. Estimates range from five hundred thousand to two million members worldwide.

History

Origins
The development of the local churches can be traced to the conversion of Watchman Nee in Fuzhou, China. Nee began to meet outside of denominations with a small group of believers in 1922. At an early age, Nee committed his life to Christian ministry and began to publish his works on the Christian faith and on church practice after moving to Shanghai in 1927.

Nee appreciated the teachings of the Plymouth Brethren, especially John Nelson Darby, and many of Nee's teachings, including not taking a name, plural eldership, disavowal of a clergy-laity distinction, and worship centered around the Lord's Supper, mirror that source. From 1930 to 1935, there was communication internationally between the local churches and the branch of the Plymouth Brethren Christian Church associated with James Taylor, Sr. The Taylor group of Exclusive Brethren saw the churches in China as a parallel work of God. However, Nee and other Chinese leaders disagreed with their prohibition of celebrating The Lord's Supper with Christians outside of their own meetings. Matters came to a head when Exclusive Brethren leaders discovered that Nee had broken bread with non-Brethren Christians, including T. Austin-Sparks in London and Thornton Stearns in Hartford, during a 1933 visit to the United Kingdom and North America. After a series of letters exchanged between leaders in New York, London, and Shanghai over a two-year period, on 31 August 1935, the Exclusive Brethren in London wrote to Shanghai terminating their fellowship.

Nee's seminal works expounding his view of local churches—The Assembly Life and Concerning Our Missions—were written against the background of his experience with the Exclusive Brethren. Nee taught that there should only be one church in every city, that Christians should meet together simply as believers living in the same city regardless of differences in doctrine or practice. Nee believed that this would eliminate divisions between Christians and provide the broadest basis upon which all believers could meet. Both Nee and Witness Lee emphasized the New Testament's references to churches by the name of the city (for example, in Acts, the Christians in Jerusalem being referred to as "the church which was at Jerusalem" (NKJV), as well as other verses with the same convention, including 1 Corinthians 1:2; Revelation 2:1, 8, 12, 18; 3:1, 7 and 14). Since Nee and Lee taught that there should only be one church in each city, and that that city was the extent of a church's jurisdiction, members of the local churches usually refer to their congregations as "the church in (city name)." According to Nee, this means that "the church in her locality must be inclusive, not exclusive,” that is, it “must include all the children of God in the whole spectrum of Christian faith and practice."

Though Nee took the lead among the local churches in China, it was through one of his co-workers—Witness Lee —that the local churches spread worldwide. The two men first met in Lee's hometown of Yantai in 1932.  Two years later, Lee moved to Shanghai to work with Nee. One of Lee's responsibilities there was the editing of some of Nee's publications. In the following years, Nee published many works and held regular conferences and trainings for church workers. Nee, Lee and other workers established over seven hundred local churches throughout China before the Communist Revolution resulted in the establishment of the People’s Republic of China in 1949. Near the end of the Communist Revolution, Nee sent Witness Lee to Taiwan to ensure that their work would survive the political turmoil.

Developments after 1949
The Denunciation Movement that began in 1951 after China entered the Korean War aimed at severing Christian groups in China from foreign influence, including expelling all foreign missionaries. As a side effect of the disbanding of mission churches, the local churches experienced "a spectacular rise in membership." The Denunciation Movement turned to leading Chinese Christians who would not join the Three-Self Reform Movement. Nee, who managed his family's pharmaceutical company, was imprisoned in 1952 during the Five-Anti Campaign and died in a labor camp 20 years later. Meanwhile, the work in Taiwan led by Witness Lee had grown to more than twenty thousand members in sixty-five churches. Witness Lee visited the United States in 1958 and moved there in 1962, settling first in Los Angeles. Today there are 250 local churches in the United States with approximately 30,000 members, and local churches can be found on all six inhabited continents.

Church meetings
The local churches practice mutuality in their meetings based on verses such as 1 Corinthians 14:26 ("Whenever you come together, each one has a psalm, has a teaching, has a revelation, has a tongue, has an interpretation. Let all things be done for building up.").  Participants are encouraged to request hymns, offer brief comments, or pray at will. This is particularly evident in "prophesying meetings" in which members speak one after another usually based on what they studied throughout the previous week from the Recovery Version, the books of Watchman Nee and Witness Lee, and the periodical Holy Word for Morning Revival all published by Living Stream Ministry.

Beliefs
The local churches believe that:

Evaluation
In the first decade of the 2000s, the local churches were the subject of two extensive evaluations. These evaluations were performed against the backdrop of decades of controversy (see Local Church controversies). The first was conducted by a faculty panel at Fuller Theological Seminary. After a two-year study, the Fuller panel stated, "It is the conclusion of Fuller Theological Seminary that the teachings and practices of the local churches and its members represent the genuine, historical, biblical Christian faith in every essential aspect." After a six-year study, the Christian Research Institute published a 2009 special issue of their journal in December 2009 with the words "We Were Wrong" on the cover. In it Hank Hanegraaff, Elliot Miller, and Gretchen Passantino published their findings, which resulted in a complete reversal of earlier criticisms.

See also

Local Church controversies
Living Stream Ministry
Bibles for America
Recovery Version of the Bible
The Lord's Recovery

References

External links
 .
 

Restorationism (Christianity)
Christian new religious movements
Indigenous Christianity
Nondenominational Christianity
Christian terminology